The 1976 Five Nations Championship was the 47th series of the rugby union Five Nations Championship. Including the previous incarnations as the Home Nations and Five Nations, this was the 82nd series of the northern hemisphere rugby union championship. Ten matches were played between 10 January and 20 March.

Wales won their seventh title, with a Grand Slam, and the Triple Crown.

The Scotland vs France game was played one week earlier than the England vs Wales game, to allow the BBC to cover both the latter game, and the Ireland v. Australia game in Dublin on the same day. Bill Mclaren thus, unusually, commentated on the opening two games of a Five Nations Championship for the first time since the two games per weekend format was introduced in 1974.

Participants

Table

Squads

Results

External links

The official RBS Six Nations Site

Six Nations Championship seasons
Five Nations
Five Nations
Five Nations
Five Nations
Five Nations
Five Nations
 
Five Nations
Five Nations
Five Nations